The 2008–09 Liga Premier de Ascenso season was split in two tournaments Apertura and Clausura. Liga Premier was the third-tier football league of Mexico. The season was played between 8 August 2008 and 31 May 2009. 

As of this season, the Segunda División de México was divided into different branches: the Liga Premier de Ascenso for the more developed teams that have aspirations for promotion to Liga de Ascenso and the Liga de Nuevos Talentos for those clubs with less infrastructure.

Teams

Group 1 
{{Location map+ |Mexico |width=700|float=right |caption=Location of teams in the 2008–09 LPA Group 1 |places=

Group 2

Group 3

Torneo Apertura

Regular season

Group 1

League table

Results

Group 2

League table

Results

Group 3

League table

Results

Inter–groups matches
In the Apertura 2008 and Clausura 2009 tournaments, the league determined the celebration of two weeks of matches between teams belonging to different groups.

Week 1

 Petroleros de Salamanca 0–4 Delfines de Los Cabos
 Unión de Curtidores 2–1 Vaqueros
 Bravos de Nuevo Laredo 2–0 Potros UAEM
 Excélsior 1–2 Tecamachalco
 Cruz Azul Jasso 4–0 Atlético Lagunero
 Pumas Naucalpan 2–3 Dorados Los Mochis
 ECA Norte 2–1 Loros UdeC
 Toros de Zacatecas 1–2 Albinegros de Orizaba
 Inter Playa del Carmen 1–1 Soccer Manzanillo
 Altamira 3–1 Ocelotes UNACH
 Pioneros de Cancún 1–1 Cuervos Negros de Zapotlanejo

 Celaya 1–0 Mérida
 Zorros de Reynosa 1–0 Universidad del Fútbol
 UAG Tecomán 4–0 Ángeles de Comsbmra
 Querétaro 3–0 Cachorros UdeG
 TR Córdoba 5–0 Xoloitzcuintles Vaqueros
 Zacatepec 2–1 Irapuato
 La Piedad 1–3 Dorados UACH
 Necaxa Rayos 1–0 Búhos de Hermosillo
 Tampico Madero 3–1 Cuautitlán
 Cachorros León 0–0 Atlético Tapatío

Week 2

 Irapuato 2–0 Toros de Zacatecas
 Potros UAEM 3–2 Petroleros de Salamanca
 Dorados UACH 2–2 Pioneros de Cancún
 Búhos de Hermosillo 1–1 ECA Norte
 Mérida 3–1 Cruz Azul Jasso
 Xoloitzcuintles Vaqueros 2–1 Celaya
 Tecamachalco 2–2 Querétaro
 Ángeles de Comsbmra 0–0 Zacatepec
 Albinegros de Orizaba 2–0 UAG Tecomán
 Ocelotes UNACH 3–2 La Piedad
 Atlético Tapatío 2–3 Necaxa Rayos

 Cuautitlán 3–3 Unión de Curtidores
 Atlético Lagunero 1–2 TR Córdoba
 Loros UdeC 4–1 Cachorros León
 Delfines de Los Cabos 0–0 Inter Playa del Carmen
 Dorados Los Mochis 2–1 Tampico Madero
 Vaqueros 2–0 Pumas Naucalpan
 Cuervos Negros de Zapotlanejo 3–0 Altamira
 Zorros de Reynosa 5–1 Excélsior
 Soccer Manzanillo 4–2 Bravos de Nuevo Laredo
 Universidad del Fútbol 5–0 Cachorros UdeG

Week 3

 Irapuato 2–1 Albinegros de Orizaba
 Unión de Curtidores 2–2 Dorados Los Mochis
 Potros UAEM 3–2 Delfines de Los Cabos
 Cachorros UdeG 7–2 Tecamachalco
 Excélsior 1–4 Universidad del Fútbol
 Cruz Azul Jasso 0–2 Xoloitzcuintles Vaqueros
 Pumas Naucalpan 3–1 Tampico Madero
 ECA Norte 2–1 Cachorros León
 Ocelotes UNACH 3–0 Dorados UACH
 Atlético Tapatío 1–2 Búhos de Hermosillo
 Cuautitlán 1–0 Vaqueros

 Inter Playa del Carmen 0–1 Bravos de Nuevo Laredo
 Atlético Lagunero 0–1 Mérida
 Altamira 1–1 Pioneros de Cancún
 Toros de Zacatecas 4–3 Ángeles de Comsbmra
 La Piedad 0–2 Cuervos Negros de Zapotlanejo
 Celaya 0–1 TR Córdoba
 UAG Tecomán 1–1 Zacatepec
 Querétaro 0–0 Zorros de Reynosa
 Soccer Manzanillo 7–2 Petroleros de Salamanca
 Necaxa Rayos 2–4 Loros UdeC

Week 4

 Petroleros de Salamanca 2–3 Dorados UACH
 Potros UAEM 1–1 Irapuato
 Cachorros UdeG 4–3 Unión de Curtidores
 Búhos de Hermosillo 3–3 Ocelotes UNACH
 Xoloitzcuintles Vaqueros 2–2 Inter Playa del Carmen
 Tecamachalco 0–2 Celaya
 Ángeles de Comsbmra 0–0 Atlético Lagunero
 Albinegros de Orizaba 1–2 Cuervos Negros de Zapotlanejo
 Mérida 3–4 Soccer Manzanillo
 Loros UdeC 4–1 Cuautitlán
 Pioneros de Cancún 2–1 Excélsior

 Delfines de Los Cabos 2–2 La Piedad
 Dorados Los Mochis 2–2 Necaxa Rayos
 Vaqueros 0–0 Cruz Azul Jasso
 Zorros de Reynosa 1–1 Atlético Tapatío
 Universidad del Fútbol 4–1 Toros de Zacatecas
 Querétaro 0–0 UAG Tecomán
 TR Córdoba 3–3 Altamira
 Zacatepec 2–2 Bravos de Nuevo Laredo
 Tampico Madero 4–0 ECA Norte
 Cachorros León 2–2 Pumas Naucalpan

Liguilla

Quarter-finals

First leg

Second leg

Semi-finals

First leg

Second leg

Final

First leg

Second leg

Torneo Clausura
In the final part of the Clausura 2009 tournament, the regular season and the start of the playoffs were affected by the 2009 swine flu pandemic, so some games were canceled and the coefficient of points/games played had to be used to determine the final positions of the classification table. In addition, some games were played behind closed doors, however, the season could end in the usual way.

Regular season

Group 1

League table

Results

Group 2

League table

Results

Group 3

League table

Results

Inter–groups matches
In the Apertura 2008 and Clausura 2009 tournaments, the league determined the celebration of two weeks of matches between teams belonging to different groups.

Week 1

 Potros UAEM 4–0 Bravos de Nuevo Laredo
 Dorados UACH 2–1 La Piedad
 Cahorros UdeG 1–2 Querétaro
 Búhos de Hermosillo 2–1 Necaxa Rayos
 Xoloitzcuintles Vaqueros 1–0 TR Córdoba
 Tecamachalco 1–1 Excélsior
 Ángeles de Comsbmra 2–1 UAG Tecomán
 Atlético Tapatío 2–0 Cachorros León
 Mérida 1–0 Celaya
 Ocelotes UNACH 3–1 Altamira
 Dorados Los Mochis 2–0 Pumas Naucalpan

 Delfines de Los Cabos 1–0 Petroleros de Salamanca
 Cuautitlán 2–0 Tampico Madero
 Loros UdeC 2–2 ECA Norte
 Atlético Lagunero 1–2 Cruz Azul Jasso
 Vaqueros 1–1 Unión de Curtidores
 Cuervos Negros de Zapotlanejo 0–0 Pioneros de Cancún
 Irapuato 3–0 Zacatepec
 Universidad del Fútbol 2–4 Zorros de Reynosa
 Albinegros de Orizaba 1–1 Toros de Zacatecas
 Soccer Manzanillo 3–1 Inter Playa del Carmen

Week 2

 Petroleros de Salamanca 1–1 Potros UAEM
 Cachorros UdeG 1–3 Universidad del Fútbol
 Unión de Curtidores 1–2 Cuautitlán
 Bravos de Nuevo Laredo 0–1 Soccer Manzanillo
 Cruz Azul Jasso 2–1 Mérida
 Excélsior 0–1 Zorros de Reynosa
 Pumas Naucalpan 2–0 Vaqueros
 ECA Norte 0–0 Búhos de Hermosillo
 Pioneros de Cancún 0–0 Dorados UACH
 Inter Playa del Carmen 2–3 Delfines de Los Cabos

 Altamira 4–1 Cuervos Negros de Zapotlanejo
 Toros de Zacatecas 1–3 Irapuato
 Celaya 0–2 Xoloitzcuintles Vaqueros
 UAG Tecomán 2–2 Albinegros de Orizaba
 Zacatepec 2–2 Ángeles de Comsbmra
 Querétaro 4–1 Tecamachalco
 Tampico Madero 0–5 Dorados Los Mochis
 La Piedad 2–1 Ocelotes UNACH
 Necaxa Rayos 2–2 Atlético Tapatío
 Cachorros León 0–2 Loros UdeC

Week 3

 Petroleros de Salamanca 0–1 Soccer Manzanillo
 Dorados UACH 4–1 Ocelotes UNACH
 Búhos de Hermosillo 3–2 Atlético Tapatío
 Bravos de Nuevo Laredo 0–1 Inter Playa del Carmen
 Xoloitzcuintles Vaqueros 2–2 Cruz Azul Jasso
 Tecamachalco 3–2 Cachorros UdeG
 Ángeles de Comsbmra 2–0 Toros de Zacatecas
 Delfines de Los Cabos 4–1 Potros UAEM
 Pioneros de Cancún 0–1 Altamira
 Loros UdeC 2–0 Necaxa Rayos

 Dorados Los Mochis 1–1 Unión de Curtidores
 Vaqueros 2–1 Cuautitlán
 Cuervos Negros de Zapotlanejo 1–2 La Piedad
 Universidad del Fútbol 3–2 Excélsior
 TR Córdoba 0–0 Celaya
 Albinegros de Orizaba 1–0 Irapuato
 Zacatepec 5–0 UAG Tecomán
 Zorros de Reynosa 0–2 Querétaro
 Tampico Madero 1–2 Pumas Naucalpan
 Cachorros León 2–1 ECA Norte

Week 4

 Dorados UACH 0–0 Petroleros de Salamanca
 Bravos de Nuevo Laredo 0–0 Zacatepec
 Unión de Curtidores 3–1 Cachorros UdeG
 Excélsior 1–1 Pioneros de Cancún
 Cruz Azul Jasso 3–1 Vaqueros
 Atlético Tapatío 2–1 Zorros de Reynosa
 ECA Norte 1–1 Tampico Madero
 Ocelotes UNACH 3–2 Búhos de Hermosillo
 Cuautitlán 1–0 Loros UdeC
 Inter Playa del Carmen 0–2 Xoloitzcuintles Vaqueros

 Pumas Naucalpan 1–1 Cachorros León
 Toros de Zacatecas 0–3 Universidad del Fútbol
 Altamira 2–0 TR Córdoba
 Celaya 1–2 Tecamachalco
 Cuervos Negros de Zapotlanejo 1–2 Albinegros de Orizaba
 UAG Tecomán 2–2 Querétaro
 Irapuato 0–2 Potros UAEM
 Soccer Manzanillo 2–0 Mérida
 La Piedad 2–1 Delfines de Los Cabos
 Necaxa Rayos 3–2 Dorados Los Mochis

Liguilla

Quarter-finals

First leg

Second leg

Semi-finals

First leg

Second leg

Final

First leg

Second leg

Relegation Table

Promotion Final 
The Promotion Final is a series of matches played by the champions of the tournaments Apertura and Clausura, the game is played to determine the winning team of the promotion to Liga de Ascenso. 
The first leg was played on 27 May 2009, and the second leg was played on 30 May 2009.

First leg

Second leg

See also 
Primera División de México Apertura 2008
Primera División de México Clausura 2009
2008–09 Primera División A season
2008–09 Liga de Nuevos Talentos season

References

External links 
 Official website of Liga Premier
 Magazine page  

 
1